The Residency (Malay: Seri Mutiara) is the official residence of Penang's head of state, the governor of Penang. Located in the city of George Town in Penang, Malaysia, it was built by the British in 1888 and the mansion used to serve as the official residence of the highest-ranking British officer in Penang until the Malayan independence in 1957.

The grounds of The Residency, through which the Waterfall River flows, is home to several rare species of plants, such as a baobab tree (one of only three such trees in Penang), the Brazil nut, Indian ebony and the cannon-ball tree.

History 

The Residency, designed by a British Army engineer, Sir Maurice Cameron, was constructed in 1888. The mansion took two years to complete and cost $48,000 (Straits dollar). Fittings and furnishing pushed the overall cost of the mansion to $81,000, and includes a manually-powered Indian punkah within its Banquet Hall.

Upon its completion, The Residency became the official residence of the governor of Penang, a role which it fulfills to this day. Prior to the construction of The Residency, the highest ranking British administrators in Penang had resided along Northam Road, along the city's northern shoreline. The mansion's first occupant was A.M. Skinner, who served as the Resident Councillor of Penang between 1887 and 1897. As the Resident Councillor was also the chairman of the newly established Penang Botanic Gardens, a garden was created within the compound of The Residency, filled with native and rare species of tropical plants.

After the independence of Malaya in 1957, the position of the governor of Penang was officially renamed in Malay as the Yang di-Pertua Negeri. Similarly, the residence, now a property of the Penang state government, has been officially renamed as Seri Mutiara, a reflection of Penang's fame as the Pearl of the Orient (Malay: Pulau Mutiara).

See also
Seri Teratai
Suffolk House

References 

Official residences of Malaysian state leaders
Buildings and structures in George Town, Penang
Houses completed in 1890